Uldis Briedis (born 1942) is a Latvian politician and a Deputy of the Saeima. He is a member of the People's Party.

References

Deputies of the Saeima
1942 births
Living people
People's Party (Latvia) politicians
21st-century Latvian politicians
Place of birth missing (living people)
Date of birth missing (living people)